Luke Loughlin (born 1994/1995) is a dual player of Gaelic games, who plays football for The Downs, hurling for Clonkill and also plays at senior level for the Westmeath county football team. He has also featured for the New York county football team.

Loughlin is from Mullingar. He was a playing member of the team when Westmeath won the 2019 National Football League Division 3 league title by a goal against Laois at Croke Park.

He has spoken openly about his struggles with addiction.

Honours
The Downs
 Westmeath Senior Football Championship (1): 2022

Clonkill
 Westmeath Senior Hurling Championship (3): 2018–2020

Westmeath
 Tailteann Cup (1): 2022
 National Football League Division 3 (1): 2019

References

1990s births
Living people
Clonkill hurlers
The Downs Gaelic footballers
Dual players
New York inter-county Gaelic footballers
People from Mullingar
Westmeath inter-county Gaelic footballers